A list of films produced in Pakistan in 1958 (see 1958 in film) and in the Urdu language:

1958

See also
 1958 in Pakistan

References

External links
 Search Pakistani film - IMDB.com

1958
Pakistani
Films